Copper(II) acetate, also referred to as cupric acetate, is the chemical compound with the formula Cu(OAc)2 where AcO− is acetate. The hydrated derivative, Cu2(OAc)4(H2O)2, which contains one molecule of water for each copper atom, is available commercially. Anhydrous copper(II) acetate is a dark green crystalline solid, whereas Cu2(OAc)4(H2O)2 is more bluish-green. Since ancient times, copper acetates of some form have been used as fungicides and green pigments. Today, copper acetates are used as reagents for the synthesis of various inorganic and organic compounds. Copper acetate, like all copper compounds, emits a blue-green glow in a flame.

Structure

Copper acetate hydrate adopts the paddle wheel structure seen also for related Rh(II) and Cr(II) tetraacetates. One oxygen atom on each acetate is bound to one copper atom at 1.97 Å (197 pm). Completing the coordination sphere are two water ligands, with Cu–O distances of 2.20 Å (220 pm). The two copper atoms are separated by only 2.62 Å (262 pm), which is close to the Cu–Cu separation in metallic copper. The two copper centers interact resulting in a diminishing of the magnetic moment such that at temperatures below 90 K, Cu2(OAc)4(H2O)2 is essentially diamagnetic. Cu2(OAc)4(H2O)2 was a critical step in the development of modern theories for antiferromagnetic exchange coupling, which ascribe its low-temperature diamagnetic behavior to cancellation of the two opposing spins on the adjacent copper atoms.

Synthesis
Copper(II) acetate is prepared industrially by heating copper(II) hydroxide or basic copper(II) carbonate with acetic acid.

Related compounds
Heating a mixture of anhydrous copper(II) acetate and copper metal affords copper(I) acetate:
Cu + Cu(OAc)2 → 2 CuOAc
Unlike the copper(II) derivative, copper(I) acetate is colourless and diamagnetic.

"Basic copper acetate" is prepared by neutralizing an aqueous solution of copper(II) acetate. The basic acetate is poorly soluble. This material is a component of verdigris, the blue-green substance that forms on copper during long exposures to atmosphere.

Uses in chemical synthesis
Copper(II) acetate has found some use as an oxidizing agent in organic syntheses. In the Eglinton reaction Cu2(OAc)4 is used to couple terminal alkynes to give a 1,3-diyne:
Cu2(OAc)4 + 2 RC≡CH → 2 CuOAc + RC≡C−C≡CR + 2 HOAc
The reaction proceeds via the intermediacy of copper(I) acetylides, which are then oxidized by the copper(II) acetate, releasing the acetylide radical. A related reaction involving copper acetylides is the synthesis of ynamines, terminal alkynes with amine groups using Cu2(OAc)4. It has been used for hydroamination of acrylonitrile.

It is also an oxidising agent in Barfoed's test.

It reacts with arsenic trioxide to form copper acetoarsenite, a powerful insecticide and fungicide called Paris green.

Mineralogy
The mineral hoganite is a naturally occurring form of copper(II) acetate. A related mineral, also containing calcium, is paceite. Both are very rare.

External links

Copper.org – Other Copper Compounds  5 Feb. 2006
Infoplease.com – Paris green 6 Feb. 2006
Verdigris – History and Synthesis 6 Feb. 2006
Australian - National Pollutant Inventory 8 Aug. 2016
USA NIH National Center for Biotechnology Information 8 Aug. 2016

References

Copper(II) compounds
Acetates
Oxidizing agents
Catalysts